The 1983 Intercontinental Cup was the inaugural roller hockey tournament known as the Intercontinental Cup, played in February 1983. This first edition saw a very different format compared with the other editions, as there were 8 teams (2 teams from Europe, 2 from Brazil, 2 from Argentina and 2 from Chile) playing a round robin pool, each team competing against every other. FC Barcelona won the tournament, above FC Porto. This edition wasn't official until it was recognize by World Skate in 2018.

Results

Standings

See also
FIRS Intercontinental Cup

References

External links
1983 Intercontinental Cup in rink-hockey.net historical database

FIRS Intercontinental Cup
1983 in roller hockey
1983 in Brazilian sport
International roller hockey competitions hosted by Brazil